Hype is an American sketch comedy television series which ran for 17 episodes from October 8, 2000 to February 18, 2001 on The WB.

Created by Scott King, Lanier Laney and Terry Sweeney, the series was ordered by the WB after the trio wrote a sketch for MADtv which parodied Felicity, the network's major hit series at the time. The series focused on sketches parodying pop culture, particularly the overinflation of cultural and public relations hype.

King, Laney and Sweeney were also writers for the series, along with Jordan Black, Jerry Collins, Jay Johnston, Kent Fuher, Karen Kilgariff, Lori Nasso, Andy Bobrow, David Sussin, Steve Holland, Warren Lieberstein, Robert Sherman and John Unholz.

On February 8, 2001 the series was canceled after one season, although two of its cast members, Frank Caliendo and Daniele Gaither, subsequently joined MADtv, while Gavin Crawford has had success as a television comedian in Canada, including on The Gavin Crawford Show and This Hour Has 22 Minutes.

Cast
Stephen E. Kramer
Michael Roof
Frank Caliendo
Jennifer Elise Cox
Gavin Crawford
Daniele Gaither
Nadya Ginsburg
Christen Nelson
Shayma Tash
Chris Williams

Theme Song

The theme song to the show was "Bodyrock" by Moby, which was played during the opening credits.

References

External links
 

2000s American sketch comedy television series
2000 American television series debuts
2001 American television series endings
Television series by Warner Bros. Television Studios
The WB original programming
English-language television shows